The Yellowstone River is a river in Duchesne County, Utah in the United States.

See also
List of rivers of Utah
List of tributaries of the Colorado River

References

Rivers of Utah
Rivers of Duchesne County, Utah